Razg or Razk or Razq or Rezg or Razag or Rezq may refer to various places in Iran:
 Razag, Fars
 Razg, Gonabad, Razavi Khorasan Province
 Razg, Torbat-e Heydarieh, Razavi Khorasan Province
 Razg, Birjand, South Khorasan Province
 Razg, Khusf, South Khorasan Province
 Rezg, Nehbandan, South Khorasan Province
 Razq, Sarbisheh, South Khorasan Province